The Jacuí River is a river of São Paulo state in southeastern Brazil.

See also
List of rivers of São Paulo

References
Brazilian Ministry of Transport

Rivers of São Paulo (state)